Upsilon Geminorum, Latinized from υ Geminorum, is a star in the constellation Gemini. It has an apparent visual magnitude of 4.04, which is bright enough to be seen with the naked eye. Based upon an annual parallax shift of 12.04 mas, it is around 270 light years from the Sun. There is a visual companion: a magnitude 13.20 star located at an angular separation of 55.20″ along a position angle of 40°, as of 2008.

This is an evolved red giant star with a stellar classification of M0 III. It is estimated to have 1.52 times the mass of the Sun, but has expanded to 44 times the Sun's radius. The star is spinning with a projected rotational velocity of 5.9 km/s and is about 3.53 billion years old. Upsilon Geminorum is radiating 417 times the solar luminosity from its outer atmosphere at an effective temperature of 3926 K.

Based upon the motion of this star through space, Upsilon Geminorum is a member of the Wolf 630 moving group. This is a set of stars centered on Wolf 630 that are moving nearly in parallel and have an age of around  billion years. They may be former members of a dissolved open cluster.

References

External links

M-type giants
Gemini (constellation)
Geminorum, Upsilon
Durchmusterung objects
Geminorum, 69
060522
036962
02905
Suspected variables